The women's artistic team competition of the gymnastics events at the 2006 Central American and Caribbean Games were held in Cartagena, Colombia, on July 17.

Final

References

Central American and Caribbean Games
Gymnastics at the 2006 Central American and Caribbean Games